(born September 6, 1955) is a Japanese actress. One of her television roles was as the ninja Sagiri in the jidaigeki Abarenbo Shogun.

As of 2005, she is still active in television commercials.

On August 31, 2006, she played a guest-star role in the prime-time series Shin Kasōken no Onna File 8 on TV Asahi. She also guest-starred in the episode of Mito Komon for broadcast on August 20, 2007 (season 37, episode 20). A year later, Mayumi appeared in a TV Tokyo Wednesday night mystery show, Ryokō Sakka Chaya Jirō #8.

Filmography

Films
The Complex (2013), Hitomi's mother
Love and the Grand Tug-of-war (2021)
Fragments of the Last Will (2022)
Dr. Coto's Clinic 2022 (2022), Masayo Hoshino

Television
Ultraman Taro (1973)
The Emperor's Cook (1980), Mitsu
Dr. Coto's Clinic (2003–06), Masayo Hoshino
Last Friends (2008), Yoko Kishimoto
Reach Beyond the Blue Sky (2021), Shibusawa Masa

References

1955 births
Living people
Japanese actresses